The 2019–20 Xavier Musketeers men's basketball team represented Xavier University during the 2019–20 NCAA Division I men's basketball season as a member of the Big East Conference. Led by second-year head coach Travis Steele, they played their home games at the Cintas Center in Cincinnati, Ohio. They finished the season 19–13, 8–10 in Big East play to finish in a tie for sixth place. They lost in the first round of the Big East tournament to DePaul. Soon thereafter, all postseason tournaments were canceled due to the ongoing COVID-19 pandemic which effectively ended their season.

Previous season
The Musketeers finished the 2018–19 season 19–16, 9–9 in Big East play to finish in third place. They defeated Creighton in the quarterfinals before losing to Villanova in the semifinals of the Big East tournament. The Musketeers failed to receive a bid to a postseason tournament.

Offseason

Departures

Incoming transfers

2019 recruiting class

Roster

Jan 2, 2020 - Dahmir Bishop entered the transfer portal. Bishop would ultimately transfer to Saint Joseph's.

Schedule and results

|-
!colspan=9 style=| Exhibition

|-
!colspan=9 style=|Non-conference regular season

|-
!colspan=9 style=|Big East regular season

|-
!colspan=9 style=|Big East tournament

Rankings

References

Xavier Musketeers men's basketball seasons
Xavier
Xavier
Xavier